Abemly Meto Silu (born 23 April 2003), known as Metinho, is a Congolese-Brazilian professional footballer who plays as a midfielder for Belgian club Lommel on loan from Ligue 1 club Troyes. He was included in The Guardian's "Next Generation 2020".

Early life
Metinho was born in Matadi, Democratic Republic of the Congo, but moved to Brazil aged one, after his father, Abel, fled the country following religious persecution. After settling in the Cinco Bocas favela in Brás de Pina, a neighbourhood in Rio de Janeiro, Abel came up with the name "Metinho" for his son, taking the diminutive form of his real name, Meto, a common tradition in Brazil.

Club career
Metinho progressed through the youth sides of Madureira before going on trial with Vasco da Gama. He was offered a contract, but changed his mind before finalising the deal, determined that he would wait for Fluminense to make an offer. He joined the Tricolor, and moved from the favela into a house owned by then-teammate João Pedro. Metinho would go on to captain the under-17 team of Fluminense and play for the club's under-20 side. In March 2021, Metinho made his professional debut, coming on as a substitute for Rafael Ribeiro in a 3–0 loss to Portuguesa-RJ.

On 15 June 2021, Fluminense confirmed that Metinho had been released by the club in order to "introduce himself to his new club in Europe". On 23 July, this was confirmed to be Ligue 1 side Troyes, with which he signed a five-year contract for a reported fee of €5 million plus bonuses.

On 2 July 2022, Metinho moved to Lommel on loan for the 2022–23 season.

International career
Metinho became a naturalized Brazilian citizen in 2019. In November 2020, despite not having represented Brazil at any youth level, Metinho was called up to train with the senior squad, alongside teammate Luiz Henrique. He remains eligible to represent the country of his birth, the Democratic Republic of the Congo.

Career statistics

References

2003 births
Living people
People from Matadi
Democratic Republic of the Congo footballers
Democratic Republic of the Congo emigrants to Brazil
Naturalized citizens of Brazil
Brazilian people of Democratic Republic of the Congo descent
Brazilian footballers
Association football midfielders
Championnat National 3 players
Fluminense FC players
ES Troyes AC players
Lommel S.K. players
Democratic Republic of the Congo expatriate footballers
Brazilian expatriate footballers
Democratic Republic of the Congo expatriate sportspeople in France
Brazilian expatriate sportspeople in France
Expatriate footballers in France
Democratic Republic of the Congo expatriate sportspeople in Belgium
Brazilian expatriate sportspeople in Belgium
Expatriate footballers in Belgium